The 67th Punjabis were an infantry regiment of the British Indian Army. They could trace their origins to 1759, when they were raised as the 8th Battalion Coast Sepoys.

The regiment's first action was during the Carnatic Wars followed by the Third Anglo-Mysore War.

In 1914, during World War I the regiment was at first in the 4th (Quetta) Division which remained in India, on internal security and as a training unit. A second battalion was formed and both were posted overseas and served in the 12th Indian Division which fought in the Battle of Shaiba, the Battle of Khafajiya and the Battle of Nasiriya in the Mesopotamia Campaign. Two platoons were also posted to Tabriz, Iran as part of the Norperforce. The second battalion was also involved in the Mesopotamia campaign with the 14th Indian Division and fought in the Second Battle of Kut and the Fall of Baghdad (1917). Both battalions then served in the Third Afghan War.
 
After World War I the Indian government reformed the army moving from single battalion regiments to multi battalion regiments. In 1922, the 67th Punjabis became the 1st  and 10th (Training) Battalions, 2nd Punjab Regiment. After independence they were one of the regiments allocated to the Indian Army.

Post independence, the regiment was renamed the Punjab Regiment (India) and the original battalion became part of the 50th Parachute Brigade along with 3 Maratha and 1 Kumaon. In April 1952, 1st Punjab (Para), along with 3 Maratha (Para) and 1 Kumaon (Para) were amalgamated to form the Parachute Regiment, with 1st Punjab (Para) being renamed 1 Para (Punjab), 3 Maratha (Para) being renamed 2 Para (Maratha) and 1 Kumaon (Para) 3 Para (Kumaon). The suffix 'Punjab' was later dropped in 1960. In 1978, the unit became the third commando battalion of the Indian Army after 9 and 10 Para Cdo. Presently, the unit is called 1st Para (Special Forces) and celebrated its 250 Raising Day in October 2011.

Predecessor names
8th Battalion Coast Sepoys – 1759
8th Carnatic Battalion – 1769
7th Carnatic Battalion – 1770 
7th Madras Battalion – 1784
1st Battalion, 7th Madras Native Infantry – 1796
7th Madras Native Infantry – 1824
7th Madras Infantry – 1885
67th Punjabis – 1903

References

Sources

 
Moberly, F.J. (1923). Official History of the War: Mesopotamia Campaign, Imperial War Museum. 

British Indian Army infantry regiments
Military history of the Madras Presidency
Military units and formations established in 1759
Military units and formations disestablished in 1922